Ayre Acoustics Inc. is an American manufacturer of high-performance, high-fidelity audio components and systems co-founded in 1993 by Charles Hansen, Katie Lehr, and Peter Bohacek.

The audio output circuitry of the PonoPlayer was designed by engineers at Ayre Acoustics.

References

Audio equipment manufacturers of the United States
Manufacturing companies based in Boulder, Colorado